Felimida atlantica is a species of sea slug, a dorid nudibranch, a marine gastropod mollusk in the family Chromodorididae.

Distribution
This species was described from Ascension Island, Atlantic Ocean.

Description
The mantle of Felimida atlantica is white with small yellow spots and a band of yellow-orange at the margin.

References

Chromodorididae
Gastropods described in 2014